Tommi Salmelainen (born January 29, 1949) is a Finnish hockey left winger who played for HIFK. He was the first ever European drafted in the NHL Entry Draft in 1969 although he never did play in the National Hockey League. He was taken by the St. Louis Blues in the sixth round, 66th overall.

Tommi Salmelainen's sons Tony and Tobias were both professional ice hockey players.

References

External links

Tommi Salmelainen at Hockey Draft Central

Finnish ice hockey left wingers
HIFK (ice hockey) players
Living people
1949 births
St. Louis Blues draft picks
Ice hockey people from Helsinki